Wilfred Sidney Chitty (10 July 1912 – 2 February 1997) was an English professional footballer who played in the Football League for Chelsea, Reading and Plymouth Argyle as an outside forward. He later served West Ham United as a youth coach.

Personal life 
Chitty was exempt from military service during the Second World War. In 1944, he was injured when a V-1 flying bomb fell near his Caterham home.

Career statistics

References 

English footballers

Clapton Orient F.C. wartime guest players
English Football League players
1912 births
1997 deaths
People from Walton-on-Thames
Association football outside forwards
Association football fullbacks
Wycombe Wanderers F.C. players
Woking F.C. players
Chelsea F.C. players
Plymouth Argyle F.C. players
Reading F.C. players
West Ham United F.C. non-playing staff
Association football coaches